Charles Riechelmann (RICK-le-man, born 26 April 1972) was a Tongan-born New Zealand rugby union player. He played for Auckland provincially, the Blues in the Super Rugby competition the All Blacks at international level as the first ever Tongan-born All Black. He played six test matches (in all cases as a reserve) for New Zealand in 1997, scoring three tries. He was part of the Blues 1996 and 1997 Super 12 winning teams.

In 2020 and 2021/22, he completed two seasons of Match Fit with Classic All Blacks. He was one of the most flexible members in the group in season 2.

References

External links

Living people
New Zealand international rugby union players
New Zealand rugby union players
Blues (Super Rugby) players
1969 births
Tongan emigrants to New Zealand
People educated at Auckland Grammar School
Rugby union locks